Léon Philippe Jules Arthur Noël (March 28, 1888 – August 6, 1987) was a French diplomat, politician and historian.

Biography
He is the son of Jules Noël, conseiller d'Etat, and Cécile Burchard-Bélaváry. He received a Doctor of Laws in 1912 and then became Conseiller d'État. In 1927 he became Délégué Général of the High Commissioner of the French Republic in Rhineland.

He became Prefect of Haut-Rhin in 1930, Plenipotentiary  Minister in Prague (1932–1935), and then French Ambassador to Poland  (1935–1940).

He represented the French Minister of Foreign Affairs in the Second Armistice at Compiègne on 22 June 1940. He was named delegate general in the territories occupied on July 9, 1940. Ten days later he resigned, and he joined de Gaulle in 1943. He is member (1944) next president of French Academy of Moral and Political Sciences (1958).

He was a Member of the French Parliament (RPF) (1951–1955).

He was the first President of the Constitutional Council of France (1959–1965).

Distinctions
Grand'croix of the Légion d'honneur
Grand'croix of the Ordre national du Mérite
Krzyż Wielki (Grand cross) of the Polonia Restituta
Grand'croix of the Order of the White Lion
Knight of the Ordre des Palmes Académiques
...

Bibliography
Léon Noël, L'agression allemande contre la Pologne, Flammarion, 1946.
Collectif, In memoriam Léon Noël (1888–1987), Bulletin de la Société des Sciences Historiques et Naturelles de l'Yonne, 1987, p. 5-8. 
Yves Beauvois, Léon Noël, de Laval à de Gaulle, via Pétain, Presses universitaires du Septentrion, 2001 
Id., « Le Conseil constitutionnel à ses débuts », Commentaire, hiver 2006-2007, p. 943-954

External links
French Parliament website
French Constitutional Council website
Biography by Yves Beauvois

1888 births
1987 deaths
Prefects of France
Prefects of Haut-Rhin
20th-century French diplomats
Grand Croix of the Légion d'honneur
Grand Cross of the Ordre national du Mérite
Recipients of the Order of the White Lion
Recipients of the Order of Polonia Restituta
Chevaliers of the Ordre des Palmes Académiques
20th-century French lawyers
French people of Hungarian descent
Ambassadors of France to Poland
University of Paris alumni
Members of the Conseil d'État (France)